Marilyn Duckworth  (born 10 November 1935) is a New Zealand novelist, poet and short story writer. She has published 16 novels, one novella, a collection of short stories and a collection of poetry.  She has also written for television and radio.

Early life
Duckworth was born in Auckland, New Zealand, but spent the years between 1939 and 1947 in England. Her father was the psychologist and Esperantist Cyril Adcock, and her sister is the poet Fleur Adcock.

Career
Duckworth's first novel, A Gap in the Spectrum, was published when she was 23.

Her debut in 1959 puts her in the second generation of New Zealand novelists of the Provincial period.

Honours, awards and nominations
 1963: New Zealand Literary Fund Award for Achievement for A Barbarous Tongue
 1985: New Zealand Book Award:Fiction for Disorderly Conduct
 1095: Wattie Book of the Year Award (shortlisted) for Disorderly Conduct
 1987: Appointed an Officer of the Order of the British Empire, for services to literature, in the 1987 Queen's Birthday Honours
 1996: Commonwealth Writers' Prize (shortlisted) for  Leather Wings
 2011–2012: President of Honour of the New Zealand Society of Authors NZSA/PEN NZ
 2016: Prime Minister's Award for Literary Achievement - Fiction

Fellowships and grants
 Literary Fund Scholarship in Letters (1961 and 1972)
 Katherine Mansfield Menton Fellowship, Menton, France (1980)
 Fulbright Visiting Writer's Fellowship, United States (1987)
 Australia New Zealand Writers' Exchange Fellowship (1989)
 Victoria University of Wellington Writer's Fellowship (1990)
 Arts Council NZ Scholarship in Letters (1993)
 Hawthornden Writing fellowship, Scotland (1994)
 Sargeson Writing Fellowship, Auckland (1995)
 Auckland University Literary Fellowship (1996)
 Ucross Foundation Residency, Wyoming United States (1997)
 Millay Arts Centre Residency,  New York State United States (2001)

Selected works
 A Gap in the Spectrum (1959)
 The Matchbox House (1960)
 A Barbarous Tongue (1963)
 Over the Fence Is Out (1969).
 Other Lovers' Children: Poems 1958–74 (1975)
 Disorderly Conduct (1984)
 Married Alive (1985)
 Rest for the Wicked (1986)
 Pulling Faces (1987)
 A Message from Harpo (1989)
 Explosions in the Sun (1989), a volume of short stories
 Unlawful Entry (1992)
 Seeing Red (1993)
 Fooling (1994), a novella
 Leather Wings (1995)
 Cherries on a Plate: New Zealand Writers Talk About Their Sisters (1996 ) (editor)
 Studmuffin (1997)
 Camping on the Faultline (2000), a memoir
 Swallowing Diamonds (2003)
 Playing Friends (2007)
 The Chiming Blue: New and Selected Poems (VUP, 2017)

Plays broadcast on radio
 Feet First (Radio New Zealand) (1981)
 Home to Mother (Radio New Zealand) (1976)
 A Gap in the Spectrum (Radio New Zealand) (1972)
 A Barbarous Tongue (Radio New Zealand) (adaptation of own work for Radio New Zealand) (1973)

Television scripts
Close to Home scripts; 5 for Television One in 1975–1976.

References

Bibliography

Further reading
 The Oxford Companion to New Zealand Literature, edited by Roger Robinson & Nelson Wattie pp. 147–148 (1998, Oxford University Press, Auckland).

External links
List of New Zealand literary figures

 The New Zealand Book Council
 The New Zealand Literature File

New Zealand women novelists
New Zealand Officers of the Order of the British Empire
1935 births
Living people
20th-century New Zealand poets
New Zealand women poets
New Zealand women dramatists and playwrights
New Zealand women short story writers
20th-century New Zealand novelists
21st-century New Zealand novelists
20th-century New Zealand short story writers
21st-century New Zealand short story writers
20th-century New Zealand women writers
21st-century New Zealand women writers
20th-century New Zealand dramatists and playwrights
21st-century New Zealand dramatists and playwrights